The Battle of Amgala may refer to:

First Battle of Amgala (1976)
Battle of Amgala (1989)